Mount Ferguson may refer to:

Mount Ferguson (Antarctica)
Mount Ferguson (Ontario)